Advanced manufacturing is the use of innovative technology to improve products or processes, with the relevant technology being described as advanced, innovative or cutting edge. Advanced manufacturing industries increasingly integrate new innovative technologies in both products and processes. The rate of technology adoption and the ability to use that technology to remain competitive and add value to define the advanced manufacturing sector.   

World class manufacturing (WCM) integrates the latest-generation machinery with process/work systems to facilitate manufacturing based business development governed around manufactured products only, duly based over a high accent on product substitution or new product development.

Advanced manufacturing centers upon improving the performance of US industry through the innovative application of technologies, processes and methods to product design and production. A  survey done in 2010 by White House defined advanced manufacturing and stated that:: "A concise definition of advanced manufacturing offered by some is manufacturing that entails the rapid transfer of science and technology (S&T) into manufacturing products and processes." (PCAST, April 2010.)

Product technologies 
Organizations practicing advanced manufacturing make products characterized as:

 Products with high levels of design
 Technologically complex 
 Innovative 
 Reliable, affordable, and available 
 Newer, better, more exciting
 Products that solve a variety of problems
 Flexibility

Process technologies 
The manufacturing process technologies described in definitions of advanced manufacturing include:

 Computer technologies (e.g., CAD, CAE, CAM) (Paul Fowler, NACFAM, UK Manufacturing Advisory Service Southeast, C.B. Adams, St. Louis, OECD)
  High-Performance Computing (HPC) for modeling, simulation, and analysis (Council on Competitiveness)
 Rapid prototyping (additive manufacturing)
 High Precision technologies (Paul Fowler, NACFAM)
	Information technologies (Paul Fowler, NACFAM)
	Advanced robotics and other intelligent production systems  (US Department of Labor, ETA, C.B. Adams, St. Louis)
 Automation (UK Manufacturing Advisory Service Southeast; C.B. Adams, St. Louis)
 Control systems to monitor processes (UK Manufacturing Advisory Service Southeast)
 Sustainable and green processes and technologies (US Department of Labor)
 New industrial platform technologies (e.g., composite materials) (UK Manufacturing Advisory Service Southeast)
 Ability to custom manufacture (PCAST; Paul Fowler, NACFAM; Grow Oklahoma Campaign)
 Ability to manufacture high or low volume (scalability) (PCAST; Paul Fowler, NACFAM; Grow Oklahoma Campaign)
 High rate of manufacturing

Use of business/management methodologies
A number of organizations also included business or management methodologies in their definition of advanced manufacturing. For example, one organization defines "advanced manufacturing as the insertion of new technology, improved processes, and management methods to improve the manufacturing of products." (National Defense University, 2002, as reported in PCAST)  Another organization lists advanced manufacturing as "encompassing lean production techniques, enhanced supply chain integration, and technology assimilation". In fact, the Wikipedia definition of advanced manufacturing is "advanced planning and scheduling" described as "a manufacturing management process by which raw materials and production capacity are optimally allocated to meet demand". Overall, the following business or management methodologies were listed as being a part of advanced manufacturing:

 Quality controls (US Department of Labor)
 Lean production technologies 
 Supply chain integration 
 Advanced Planning and Scheduling (Wikipedia, online, accessed June 2010)

Other definitions
There are also definitions of "advanced manufacturing" that are used by one or a few sources.

Traditional vs. advanced manufacturers
Traditional manufacturing is defined as the act of converting raw materials into finished products by using manual or mechanized transformational techniques. The purpose of such activities is to add value to achieve targeted objectives, which do not preclude society's overall interests. In one report, the distinction between traditional sectors of manufacturing (listed as auto, steel) and others (listed as aerospace, medical device, pharmaceutical) is the basis for a definition of advanced manufacturing, with the characteristics of the two differing in terms of volume and scale economies, labor and skill content, and the depth and diversity of the network surrounding the industry (New England Council and Deloitte, as referenced in PCAST document).

Successful manufacturers
Other sources define advanced manufacturers as those that "succeed" in today's competitive environment. One source states that: "What differentiates certain companies is a unique ability to create a competitive advantage in this environment. These manufacturers think and do faster and, by definition, these advantages make them advanced." (Industrial College of the Armed Forces)  The White House survey lists some experts as defining advanced manufacturing "solely by advances that led to decreased cost or increased productivity." (PCAST)

Research and development
One organization listed "aggressive research and development" as being part of the definition of advanced manufacturing (Purdue University). Although research and development were not explicitly included in most definitions, the innovative technologies listed by many are most likely the result of extensive research and development. Development of a sound product, which satisfies given criteria with least pain, is a common challenge, most unusually, haunting the manufacturer. The domain of competition is quite large because manufacturers compete at inter-manufacturing and intra-firm levels, producing near net products. The customer desires a component which promises functions most reliably, while addressing socio-techno-environmental attributes.

Dynamic
Finally, several sources pointed out that any definition of advanced manufacturing will need to change with the changing times, and that the definition will vary for different companies and different industries. The White House survey states: "Most discussants agree that an appropriate advanced manufacturing definition should be dynamic in nature and be treated as more of a benchmark". That is, there is a constant iteration of improving manufacturing frontiers. Therefore, what is classified as "frontier" is constantly changing and likewise, advanced manufacturing is constantly changing. (PCAST)  Another source stated that: "Advanced manufacturing is like a chameleon". It changes in response to the needs of whichever company has incorporated it into its manufacturing process (St. Louis, C.B. Adams). An expert is quoted as saying: "Advanced manufacturing, by its very nature, defies definition, because it is going to be different for the chemical industry than it is for the metal fabrication industry and any other industry " (Tom White, as quoted by C.B. Adams).

Conclusion
The term "advanced manufacturing" encompasses many of the developments in the manufacturing field during the late 20th and early 21st centuries, including high tech products and processes and clean, green, and flexible manufacturing, among others. No one definition captures everything said about advanced manufacturing, although the majority of definitions found on the web include the use of innovative technology to improve products and/or processes, and may also include the use of new business/management methodologies. Accordingly, the definition that probably comes closest to being comprehensive is that given by Paul Fowler of the National Council for Advanced Manufacturing (NACFAM), celebrating its 20th anniversary this year:

"The Advanced Manufacturing entity makes extensive use of computer, high precision, and information technologies integrated with a high-performance workforce in a production system capable of furnishing a heterogeneous mix of products in small or large volumes with both the efficiency of mass production and the flexibility of custom manufacturing in order to respond quickly to customer demands " (Quoted in PCAST). In foreseeable future categorical developments facilitated with integration with computers will be largely impacted by the state of raw material and energy availability.

See also
Fourth Industrial Revolution
Smart manufacturing
Open manufacturing

References

Manufacturing
Innovation